Haft Ashiyan (also Romanized as Haft Āshīyān and Haft Āshīān; also known as Haft Āshīān-e Şoḩbat) is a village in Haft Ashiyan Rural District, Kuzaran District, Kermanshah County, Kermanshah Province, Iran. At the 2006 census, its population was 155, in 42 families.

References 

Populated places in Kermanshah County